Thurles is a civil parish in the barony of Eliogarty in County Tipperary.

Church of Ireland parish

Like all civil parishes in Ireland, this civil parish is derived from, and co-extensive with, a pre-existing parish of the Church of Ireland.

Townlands

The parish is divided into 46 townlands, one of which, Thurles Townparks, contains the historical core of the town of Thurles. These townlands are as follows:

Ardbaun
Ballycarrane
Ballygammane
Bawnanattin
Bawntameena
Bohernamona
Bowling Green
Brittas
Brittasroad
Carrigeen
Clongower
Commons
Farranreigh
Furze
Garryvicleheen
Glebe
Glengarriff
Gortataggart
Gortnaglogh
Grange
Killinane
Kilrush
Knockauns
Knockcurra
Knockeen
Laghtagalla
Lewagh Beg
Lewagh More
Liscahill
Lognafulla
Loughlahan
Monacocka
Monakeeba
Monanearla
Mullaunbrack
Mullauns
Racecourse
Rathcooney
Sheskin
Stradavoher
The Heath
Thurles Townparks
Toor
Tooreen
Turtulla
Wrensborough

References

 Thurles
Thurles